Thomas G. Burton is an American academic and author with an interest in Appalachian folk culture.

Biography
Burton was born on January 7, 1935, in Memphis, Tennessee. His first degree was a Bachelor of Arts from David Lipscomb College in 1956. He then received a Master of Arts in 1958 and a PhD in 1966, both from Vanderbilt University.

He became a member of the  Department of English of East Tennessee State University in 1958. He became a full professor in 1967, holding the position until he retired in 1995. He was appointed Professor Emeritus 1996.

Burton's book on snake handling, Taking up Serpents, was described as an authoritative study of the belief by National Geographic magazine.

Published work

 The Serpent and the Spirit: Glenn Summerford‘s Story 
 Serpent-Handling Believers
 Michael and the War in Heaven
 Rosie Hicks and Her Recipe Book (editor)
 Doubting Thomas's Book of Common Prayers
 Beech Mountain Man: The Memoirs of Ronda Lee Hicks
 Some Ballad Folks 
 Tom Ashley, Sam McGee, Bukka White: Tennessee Traditional Singers (editor)

See also
 Appalachian studies

References

External links
 Personal website
 http://artsmagazine.info/articles.php?view=detail&id=2009082722323759975

American non-fiction writers
American social sciences writers
1935 births
Living people
Appalachian studies
Vanderbilt University alumni
East Tennessee State University faculty
20th-century American writers